Ramsey is an unincorporated community in Lansing Township, Mower County, Minnesota, United States.

A post office called Ramsey was established in 1874, and closed in 1875. The community was named for Alexander Ramsey, 1st Governor of Minnesota Territory.

Notes

Unincorporated communities in Mower County, Minnesota
Unincorporated communities in Minnesota